Hassani Abdelkrim is a town and commune in Debila District, El Oued Province, Algeria. According to the 2008 census it has a population of 22,755, up from 17,207 in 1998, with a population growth rate of 2.9%.

Geography

Bordering communes

Hassani Abdelkrim commune is bordered to the north by Sidi Aoun, to the northeast by Debila, to the east and southeast by Trifaoui, to the south by El Oued, to the southwest by Kouinine, to the west by Taghzout, and to the northwest by Guemar.

Communes bordering Hassani Abdelkrim

Climate

Hassani Abdelkrim has a hot desert climate (Köppen climate classification BWh), with very hot summers and mild winters. Rainfall is light and sporadic, and summers are particularly dry.

Transportation

Hassani Abdelkrim lies on the N16 highway, 13 kilometres (12 mi) north of El Oued on the way to Tebessa, and the Tunisian border by the N48. From El Oued the N16 continues to Touggourt, and the N48 leads north towards Biskra.

Education

7.7% of the population has a tertiary education (the second highest in the province), and another 20.7% has completed secondary education. The overall literacy rate is 86.7% (the highest in the province), and is 92.7% among males (the highest in the province) and 80.6% among females (the equal highest in the province).

Localities
As of 1984, the commune of Hassani Abdelkrim included the following four localities:

Hassani Abdelkrim
Z'Goum
Doukkar
Gharbia

The village of Zmila is also within the commune.

References

Neighbouring towns and cities

Communes of El Oued Province
El Oued Province